Miruna Runcan (born October 29, 1954) is a Romanian-born writer, semiotician and theater critic. She received a PhD in Theater's Aesthetics from the Bucharest University of Theater and Film in 1999 on a complex historical and aesthetic research on the Romanian modern stage-directing and theater theories, from 1920 to 1960.

Career
After 1989, she was involved in several activist and theatrical projects, both in media ethics and theater criticism. She published the first Romanian book on media law and ethics, for young journalists (1997, Bucharest, All Publishing House), followed by The Fourth Power: Ethics and Law for Journalists (Cluj, 2002, Dacia Publishing House). After 2001, she is professor at Babeş-Bolyai University of Cluj, Romania. Still, theater criticism and interdisciplinary studies on media, film and theatre constitutes the principle field of her activities in research, writing and teaching.

She edited (with Alina Nelega as Editor in chef, C.C. Buricea-Mlinarcic and Anca Rotescu), the first Romanian interdisciplinary magazine dedicated to the alternative theatrical movement, ultimaT (Targu Mures, from 1999 to 2000). Then, as a part of an independent theatrical group in Cluj, Teatrul Imposibil, she became the editor in chief of Man.In.Fest: Performing Culture Magazine, who became in 2006 an independent publication.

In 2004, she starts - together with Romanian playwright and theatre theoretician C.C. Buricea-Mlinarcic – a complex group project, reuniting field research, anthropological analysis and theatre and film creation: the Everyday Life Drama Program. From 2009, the program became the Everyday Drama Laboratory of The Theater Research and Creation Center "Vlad Mugur", awarded with a three-year substantial research grant from the Ministry of Education and Research.

Work

Books
 Cinci divane ad-hoc, with C.C.Buricea Mlinarcic, Bucharest: Cartea Românească, 1996
 Introduction to Media Law and Ethics, Bucharest: All Publishing House, 1998
 The Romanian Theater Model, Bucharest: Unitext Publishing House, 2001
 The Fourth Power. Ethics and Law for Journalists, Cluj: Dacia Publishing House, 2002
 The “Theatricalisation” of Romanian Theatre.1920–1960, Cluj: Eikon Publishing House, 2003
 For a Semyothics of the Theatrical Performance, Cluj: Dacia Publishing House, 2005
 The Sceptical’s Spectator’s Armchair, Bucharest: Unitext Publishing House, 2007
 Habarnam in orasul teatrului/The Univers of Alexandru Dabija's Performances. Bucharest: Limes Publishing House, 2010
 Actori care ard fara rest"/Actors can Burn, Bucharest: Camil Petrescu Foundation, 2011
 Signore Misterioso. O anatomie a spectatorului/Signore Misterioso _An Anatomy of the Spectator, Bucharest: UNITEXT, 2011
 Critica de teatru. Încotro?/ Theatre Criticism. Whereto? Cluj-Napoca: Presa Universitară Clujeană, 2015
 ODEON 70. O aventură istoric-omagială/ODEON 70. A Historical Adventure, Bucharest: Oscar Print, 2016
 Teatru în diorame. Discursul criticii de teatru în comunism Vol I, Fluctuantul dezgheț /Theatre in Diorama. The Discourse of Theatre Criticism in Communism. Vol I: The Fluctuant Thaw, Bucharest, Tracus Arte, 2019.
 Teatru în diorame. Discursul criticii teatrale în comunism. Amăgitoarea primăvară 1965–1977, Vol II, Tracus Arte, 2020.
 Teatru în diorame. Discursul criticii de teatru în comunism. Viscolul 1978-1989, Vol III, Tracus Arte, 2021.

Plays
 Odaia de asediu (The Siege Room), directed by Mircea Marin, Braşov Dramatic Theater, 1983
 Atolul. Muzical după Împăratul Muştelor de William Golding(The Atoll. Musical after The Lord of the Flies by William Golding, in collaboration with C.C. Buricea-Mlinarcic, directed by Alexandru Berceanu, Zeppelin National Festival, Bucharest 2003
 Mănăştur Express, published in Man.In.Fest, nr. 16-18/2004
 Ombilicul domnului Artaud (Mr. Artaud's Bellybutton, 2009

Fiction
 Miruna Runcan, Bungee Jumping (short stories), Cluj: Limes Publishing House, 2010
 Miruna Runcan, Club 20. Retro (novel), Bucharest: Cartea romaneasca, 2017

Translations

Books
 René Girard, Despre cele ascunse de la întemeierea lumii, București: Nemira, 1998
 Michel de Ghelderode, Soarele apune, București: Alfa, 1998

Performed Plays
 Edward Albee, The Lady from Dubuque, Braşov Dramatic Theater, 1983
 Per Olof Ekström, The Lynx Hour, Bucharest, Odeon Theater, 1993

References

External links
 Alex Goldis „O sercetare arheologica a destalinizarii in teatru” https://revistavatra.org/2019/12/03/alex-goldis-o-cercetare-arheologica-a-destalinizarii-in-teatru/
 Mihaela Michailov, Miruna Runcan este deşteaptă, Book review
 Article published on www.groundreport.com
 https://editura.liternet.ro/carte/314/Miruna-Runcan/Teatralizarea-si-reteatralizarea-in-Romania-1920-1960.html
 https://editura.liternet.ro/carte/344/Miruna-Runcan/Signore-Misterioso-O-anatomie-a-spectatorului.html
 https://www.observatorcultural.ro/articol/divanul-criticii-de-teatru-i-interviu-cu-miruna-runcan/
 http://www.romlit.ro/index.pl/40_de_ani_n_300_de_pagini

Romanian essayists
Romanian women essayists
Romanian theatre critics
Women theatre critics
Romanian translators
Academic staff of the Caragiale National University of Theatre and Film
Romanian magazine editors
Romanian women editors
1954 births
Living people